Stephen Liburd (born 11 February 1955) is a Kittitian cricketer. He played in four first-class and three List A matches for the Leeward Islands from 1977 to 2011.

See also
 List of Leeward Islands first-class cricketers

References

External links
 

1955 births
Living people
Kittitian cricketers
Leeward Islands cricketers